In fireworks, a burst charge  (usually black powder)  is a pyrotechnic mixture placed in a shell which is ignited when the shell reaches the desired height in order to create an explosion and spread the stars. Burst charge compositions are usually coated onto rice hulls or other low-density fillers, which increases the rate of combustion.

In artillery and Naval artillery the burst charge or bursting charge is ignited by a primer at the base of the shell.

Common burst charges
Black powder
Flash powder
H3
Whistle mix

References 

Pyrotechnic compositions